Cocktail Slippers is a five-piece, all-female rock band from Oslo, Norway. Current band members are: Hope (vocals), Rocket Queen (guitar), Vega (guitar), Miss A-OK (drums) and Sugar(bass ). Cocktail Slippers was formed in 2001 and has since released three studio albums and two Christmas singles. They are known for their entertaining live rock ′n roll performances and have played alongside artists such as Nancy Sinatra, Crowded House, Elvis Costello and The Strokes. The band is continuously touring Europe and the USA.

The band's main musical influences are Blondie, The Shangri-Las, Joan Jett, Foo Fighters, The Ramones, The Go-Go's and The Beach Boys.

Background
In early 2001, Cocktail Slippers was formed out of another all-female band called the Barbarellas. Bass-player Sugar Cane was one of the original members of the Barbarellas. Rocket Queen and Modesty Blaze joined after the then-guitar and keyboard players left. Eventually, the Barbarellas split up in 2000, but Sugar Cane, Modesty Blaze and Rocket Queen hooked up with a new drummer to continue the project. Shortly after it was decided that it would be better to rename the band. The new name was Cocktail Slippers. The band recorded their first album, Rock It! in early spring 2001 with Modesty Blaze (Ingjerd Sandven Kleivan,
formerly known as Lisa Farfisa) on vocals and keyboard, Rocket Queen (Stine Bendiksen) vocals and guitar, Sugar Cane (Astrid Waller) on bass and Tammy Lee Sticks on drums. Later that year, the album Rock It! was released on the Norwegian label MTG Records.

In 2004 the band recorded their follow-up album Mastermind, which was also released on MTG Records. In the same year, a cover of Wham!'s "Last Christmas" was released as a limited edition CD single. The song was made available as a digital download in 2009.

In 2007, Cocktail Slippers was signed by Steven Van Zandt (also known as'"Little Steven") on his label Wicked Cool Records. In 2009 Cocktail Slippers recorded and released their third studio album Saint Valentine's Day Massacre. The album was produced by the band together with Steven Van Zandt and co-produced by Jean Beauviour (known for producing Kiss, Blondie, and The Ramones). The album features 12 tracks, although the USA vinyl release includes 2 bonus tracks as well. Besides own material, the album features two cover songs: Lesley Gore's "She's a Fool" and Connie Francis's "Don't Ever Leave Me".

The record also holds two songs written by Little Steven—"Saint Valentine's Day Massacre" and "Heard You Got A Thing For Me". The album received positive reviews worldwide with respected critics such as Rolling Stone magazine's David Fricke describing the band as "Norwegian Devil Dolls" that "sing their you-done-me-wrong songs with avenging-angel-army-harmonies". Dutch newspaper NRC Handelsblad called the women "Norwegian Rock heroines" that "pick up where Blondie left off".

Cocktail Slippers was submitted to one of the largest musicfestivals in the USA—South by Southwest both in 2010 and 2011. They performed at Hard Rock Calling in Hyde Park, London in the summer of 2012.

Cocktail Slippers was featured in the episode "The Flamingo" in the Norwegian/American mafia comedy Lilyhammer.

Personnel

Members

Current members
 Rocket Queen – lead guitar, backing vocals (2001–present)
 Sugar – bass, backing vocals (2001-2012, 2016–present)
 Miss A-OK – drums, percussion (2019–present)
 Hope – lead vocals (2011–present)
 Vega – lead guitar, backing vocals (2018–present)

Former members
 Modesty Blaze/Lisa Farfisa – lead and backing vocals, keyboards (2001-2011)
 Tammy Lee Sticks – drums, percussion (2001-2008)
 Aurora de Morales – bass, backing vocals (2012-2016)
 Piper – keyboards, backing vocals (2011–2016)
 Squirrel – guitar, backing vocals (2005-2012, 2015–2018)
 Bella Donna – drums, percussion (2008–2019)

Timeline

Discography
 2001 - Rock It!, MTG Records, Norway (CD)
 2003 - Housewives From Hell, Attitude Records, Finland (Limited 12" vinyl)
 2004 - Last Christmas/Kids In America, Flipside Records, Norway (Limited CD single)
 2004 - Mastermind, MTG Records, Norway (CD)
 2007 - Coolest Songs Of The World Vol. 2, Wicked Cool Records, USA (compilation CD)
 2007 - Mastermind, Wicked Cool Records, USA (CD + digital download)
 2008 - Christmas A Go-Go, Wicked Cool Records, USA (compilation CD + digital download)
 2009 - Saint Valentine's Day Massacre, Wicked Cool Records, USA (7" vinyl)
 2009 - Saint Valentine's Day Massacre, Wicked Cool Records, USA (CD + digital download)
 2009 - Saint Valentine's Day Massacre, Wicked Cool Records, USA (vinyl w/2 bonustracks)
 2009 - Rock It!, Wicked Cool Records, USA (CD + digital download)
 2009 - Last Christmas, Wicked Cool Records, USA (digital download)
 2010 - It's Christmas, Wicked Cool Records, USA (digital download)
 2012 - Keeps on Dancing, Wicked Cool Records, USA (digital download)
 2012 - Soul Salvation of Love, Wicked Cool Records, USA (digital download)
 2014 - "People Talk", Wicked Cool Records

References

External links
 
 

All-female punk bands
Norwegian punk rock groups
Norwegian rock music groups
Norwegian new wave musical groups
Norwegian pop rock groups
Musical groups established in 2001
2001 establishments in Norway
Musical groups from Oslo